Aznar Galíndez II was a Count of Aragón (867–893), son and successor of Galindo Aznárez I.

Aznar married Oneca, daughter of the king of Pamplona, Garcia Iñíguez, and had:
Galindo Aznárez II
García
Sancha, wife of Muhammad al-Tawil, wali of Huesca

Aznar died in 893.

References

Sources

893 deaths
Year of birth unknown
Counts of Aragon